is an underground metro station located in Shōwa-ku, Nagoya, Aichi Prefecture, Japan operated by the Nagoya Municipal Subway.  It is located 16.2 rail kilometers from the terminus of the Meijō Line at Kanayama Station. This station serves Nagoya Daini Red Cross Hospital.

History
Yagoto Nisseki Station was opened on 6 October 2004 and serves the area of Yagoto.

Lines

 (Station number: M19)

Layout
Yagoto Nisseki Station has two underground opposed side platforms.

Platforms

External links
 Yagoto Nisseki Station official web site

References

Railway stations in Aichi Prefecture
Railway stations in Japan opened in 2004
Yagoto